Bill Cahan studied architecture at Washington University in St. Louis,  and University of California, Berkeley. He became an architect and practiced at Anshen & Allen architects for five years, during which time, in addition to designing buildings, he was responsible for the rebranding of the architecture firm. In 1984, he left the architecture practice and started his own design consultancy, Cahan & Associates. He has lectured extensively around the World on the subject of design and branding for the Art Director’s Club, the AIGA, the London Type Director’s Club, at the RGD Ontario Design Thinkers Conference and at the HOW National Design Conference. He frequently judges design competitions for different design publications.

It is generally acknowledged within the design community that Cahan elevated what was at one time the dry and academic category of annual reports to a new level of quality and creativity. The "AR" not only became a powerful branding tool for otherwise difficult and uninteresting companies and organizations, such as those in biomedical, for example; Cahan's work inspired a whole new generation of creative people who began to see that annual reports and other under-appreciated media could become career-making creative opportunities.

The Cahan & Associates process was almost obsessively concerned with studying and analyzing the culture and ethos of their client's company, with their stated mission to "work harder to understand their clients better than any other firm." This thoroughness showed up in intelligent, sophisticated communications for clients Herman Miller, Effen Vodka, Morgan Stanley,  Aldo Shoes and others. Another anomaly of the firm was the way in which they approached each project: while most design firms hire writers to work with designers, Cahan insisted that his designers be strong writers and for the most part create their own content. Another innovation that Cahan introduced was having a variety of designers working on every project independently so as to give clients a range of creative work to choose from. The volume of work that poured into the San Francisco practice from a variety of clients provided each designer with enough work that competitive strife and conflict was not an issue, and it was generally felt that "the right client would choose the right work from the right designer."

Cahan also had success as a mentor and creative director, with many of his hires coming straight out of school and rising up within the organization to become internationally known and respected designers or principals in their own firms, Bob Dinetz, Michael Braley, Talin Gureghian Hall and Michael Verdine among them.

In 1999, the book "I Am Almost Always Hungry" (Princeton Architectural Press) profiled the firm's unusual creative process.

In 2009, Cahan scaled back his operation to focus on consulting with Fortune 500 companies and start-ups.

Cahan was also an accomplished tennis player at the San Francisco Tennis Club, especially known for his forehand.

External links 
Cahan & Associates Homepage
Anshen and Allen

Sam Fox School of Design & Visual Arts alumni
20th-century American architects
Living people
21st-century American architects
UC Berkeley College of Environmental Design alumni
Year of birth missing (living people)